Massimo Andrea Leggeri (born 6 February 1950 in Rome) is an Italian diplomat.

Biography
He received his Doctorate in Political Science from the University “La Sapienza” in 1971.

After a long diplomatic career he was appointed Italian Ambassador to South Korea with coaccreditation to North Korea (2006-2010).

See also 
 Ministry of Foreign Affairs (Italy)
 Foreign relations of Italy

References

1950 births
Living people
Ambassadors of Italy to North Korea
Ambassadors of Italy to South Korea
Ambassadors of Italy to Uruguay
Diplomats from Rome
Italian diplomats
20th-century diplomats